Rafflesia aurantia is a member of the genus Rafflesia.  It is a parasitic flowering plant endemic to Luzon Island, Philippines in the Quirino Protected Landscape. See original publication and a review of Philippine Rafflesia.

References

External links
 Parasitic Plant Connection: Rafflesia aurantia page

aurantia
Parasitic plants
Endemic flora of the Philippines
Flora of Luzon